West Kyo (also known locally as Old Kyo) is a small village in County Durham, England, United Kingdom. The name 'kyo' is derived from an old word for 'cow'. It is situated a very short distance to the north of Annfield Plain and to the east of Catchgate. Close by are East Kyo and to the north, Harperley. The nearest large town is Stanley. The skyline is dominated by the Pontop Pike Television Transmitter to the northwest.

The main landmark of the village is the Earl Grey Inn public house, with an internal decor of wooden beams and whitewash walls. This pub is reputed to be haunted by a ghost called 'The Grey Lady', a former landlady who died in the 19th century. Another former landlord also placed five and ten pence pieces in gaps within the wooden beams during the 1990s, some of which are still being found to this day. The pub is known locally for a quiz night on Thursdays and karaoke on Saturdays.

The village developed during former periods of heavy coal mining in the area during the 19th century and a gas works used to be situated on its northern edge. A period of substantial decline followed during the 20th century, during which the village lost a school, a local shop and a second public house called The Rose Cottage, which had an 'ale only' licence (now converted to a house). New developments starting in the late 1980s onwards have, however, seen a recent expansion in the village in terms of size and population.

Famous people
West Kyo was the birthplace of John Buddle (1773), the famous colliery viewer and mining engineer, who later went on to work with Charles Vane, 3rd Marquess of Londonderry in the development of Seaham Harbour.

Kyo Village was the birthplace of Hugh Simpson Rodham (on 16th Aug 1879), Hillary Clinton's grandfather who emigrated to the United States.

References

External links

Villages in County Durham
Stanley, County Durham